Uijeongbu Cycling Team is a South Korean UCI Continental cycling team established in 2018.

Team roster

References

External links

UCI Continental Teams (Asia)
Cycling teams based in South Korea